Rufus Benajamin "Cow" Nalley (December 27, 1870 – November 28, 1902) was a three sport participant at the University of Georgia, playing football and baseball and participating in track and field. He was described as being of average height and weighing around 200 pounds.

Nalley is the only five-year letterman in the history of Georgia Bulldogs football, lettering each year from 1892 to 1896. In Georgia's inaugural season in 1892, Nalley played tackle. During the next two seasons (1893 and 1894), Nalley played center. When Pop Warner came to coach Georgia football for the 1895 and 1896 seasons, Nalley was moved to halfback. Cow Nalley was the captain of the 1896 team, the first undefeated football team at Georgia.

Nalley was a three-year letterman in baseball, earning letters in 1894, 1895 and 1896. He also threw the hammer and the shot put when participating in track and field events at Georgia.

After his playing career, Nalley joined Georgia as an assistant coach for the 1897 and 1898 seasons. In 1899, Nalley was named head coach for Georgia Tech, but finished the year with no wins and just one tie in seven games.

Nalley died on November 28, 1902, in Atlanta, Georgia, after a short, serious illness. According to some, the last thing that he heard before losing consciousness on November 27, 1902, was that Georgia had beaten its rival Auburn earlier that day, news that caused him to smile. It was the first victory for Georgia in the Deep South's Oldest Rivalry since the championship season of 1896 for which Nalley played.

Head coaching record

References

External links
 Reed, Thomas Walter (1949). Athens, Georgia: University of Georgia Press. History of the University of Georgia; Chapter XVII: Athletics at the University from the Beginning Through 1947, imprint pages 3429-3430, 3433, 3439, 3443-3444, 3471
 

1870 births
1902 deaths
19th-century players of American football
American football centers
American football halfbacks
American football tackles
American male hammer throwers
American male shot putters
Coaches of American football from Georgia (U.S. state)
Georgia Bulldogs baseball players
Georgia Bulldogs football players
Georgia Bulldogs track and field athletes
Georgia Tech Yellow Jackets football coaches
People from Villa Rica, Georgia
Players of American football from Georgia (U.S. state)
Sportspeople from the Atlanta metropolitan area
Track and field athletes from Georgia (U.S. state)